The 2003–04 Stanford Cardinal men's basketball team represented Stanford University in the 2003–04 NCAA Division I men's basketball season. It was Head Coach Mike Montgomery's eighteenth and final season with the Cardinal. The Cardinal were a member of the Pacific-10 Conference and were the Pac-10 regular season champions as well as the Pac-10 Tournament champions.

Roster

Schedule and results

|-
!colspan=12 style=| Exhibition

|-
!colspan=12 style=| Non-conference regular season

|-
!colspan=12 style=| Pac-10 Regular season

|-
!colspan=12 style=| Pac-10 tournament

|-
!colspan=12 style=| NCAA tournament

Source:

Rankings

Stanford was ranked #17 in the preseason Coaches' Poll and #20 in the preseason AP Poll.  After going undefeated after 14 games, the Cardinal climbed to #2 in both polls (behind only Duke) by the ninth week of the season, where they remained until the thirteenth week of the season when they reached #1 in both polls.  The Cardinal remained there until dropping to #2 in the sixteenth week (behind undefeated St. Joseph's) after their undefeated streak of 26 games ended when they were upset by Washington.  The Cardinal returned to the #1 ranking the following week (the final poll of the season) after St. Joseph's lost 87–67 to Xavier in the quarterfinals of the Atlantic 10 tournament.

Pac-10 tournament

NCAA tournament

Awards and honors
Mike Montgomery, Legends of Coaching Award (adopted by the John R. Wooden Award Committee)

2004 NBA draft

References

Stanford Cardinal men's basketball seasons
Stanford Cardinal
Pac-12 Conference men's basketball tournament championship seasons
Stanford Cardinal men's basketball team
Stanford Cardinal men's basketball team
Stanford